The Betancuria Express is a fast passenger and vehicle ferry operated by the Canary Islands ferry company Fred. Olsen Express on the route between Gran Canaria and Fuerteventura. It was built in 2011 by Austal in Perth, Australia as the Leonora Christina for BornholmerFærgen.

History
The Betancuria Express was built by Austal in Perth, Australia for BornholmerFærgen as the Leonora Christina, being completed in March 2011. It commenced operating between  Rønne in Denmark and Ystad in Sweden in June 2011.

In April 2017, the Leonora Christina was sold to Fred. Olsen Express, although the transfer did not take place until the September 2018. Since October 2018, the ship, now renamed as Betancuria Express, serves the route between Las Palmas de Gran Canaria and Morro Jable, in the south of Fuerteventura.

References

External links

Fred Olsen Express description of the ship
tv2bornholm.dk
Historisk ballade om færgenavn

Ferries of Denmark
Ferries of Spain
Individual catamarans
Fred. Olsen & Co.
Ships built by Austal
Water transport in Denmark
Water transport in Sweden
Transport in the Canary Islands
2011 ships